Lekowo may refer to the following places in Poland:
Lekowo, Masovian Voivodeship
Lekowo, West Pomeranian Voivodeship
Łękowo, Podlaskie Voivodeship